Indeterminate may refer to:

In mathematics
 Indeterminate (variable), a symbol that is treated as a variable
 Indeterminate system, a system of simultaneous equations that has more than one solution
 Indeterminate equation, an equation that has more than one solution
 Indeterminate form, an algebraic expression with certain limiting behaviour in mathematical analysis

Other
 Indeterminate growth, a term in biology and especially botany
 Indeterminacy (philosophy), describing the shortcomings of definition in philosophy
 Indeterminacy (music), music for which the composition or performance is determined by chance
 Statically indeterminate, in statics, describing a structure for which the static equilibrium equations are insufficient for determining the internal forces

See also
 Indeterminacy (disambiguation)